The theft of fire for the benefit of humanity is a theme that recurs in many world mythologies. This narrative is classified in the Motif-Index of Folk-Literature as motif A1415. Its recurrent themes include a trickster figure as the thief, and a supernatural guardian who hoards fire from humanity, often out of mistrust for humans.

Examples

Africa 

 The San peoples, the indigenous Southern African hunter-gatherers, tell how ǀKaggen, in the form of a mantis, brought the first fire to the people by stealing it from the ostrich, who kept the fire beneath its wings. In another version of the myth, Piisi|koagu steals fire from the ostrich.

The Americas
 Among various Native American tribes of the Pacific Northwest and First Nations, fire was stolen and given to humans by Coyote, Beaver or Dog.
 In Algonquin myth, Rabbit stole fire from an old man and his two daughters.
 In Cherokee myth, after Possum and Buzzard had failed to steal fire, Grandmother Spider used her web to sneak into the land of light. She stole fire, hiding it in a clay pot or a silk net.
 According to a Mazatec legend, the opossum spread fire to humanity. Fire fell from a star and an old woman kept it for herself. The opossum took fire from the old woman and carried the flame on its tail, resulting in its hairlessness.
 According to the Muscogees/Creeks, Rabbit stole fire from the Weasels.
 In Ojibwa myth, Nanabozho the hare stole fire and gave it to humans.
 According to some Yukon First Nations people, Crow stole fire from a volcano in the middle of the water.
 In a story from the Lengua/Enxet people of the Gran Chaco in Paraguay, a man steals fire from a bird after he notices the bird cooking snails on burning sticks. The bird enacts revenge by creating a thunderstorm that damages the man's village.

Eurasia
 According to the vedic Rigveda (3:9.5), the hero Mātariśvan recovered fire, which had been hidden from humanity.
 In Greek mythology, according to Hesiod (Theogony, 565-566 and Works & Days, 50) and Pseudo-Apollodorus (Bibliotheca, 1.7.1), Titan Prometheus steals the heavenly fire for humanity, enabling the progress of civilization, for which he is punished by being chained to a mountain and having his liver eaten by an eagle every day.
 In one of the versions of Georgian myth, Amirani stole fire from metalsmiths, who refused to share it – and knowledge of creating it – with other humans.
 The Vainakh hero Pkharmat brought fire to mankind and was chained to Mount Kazbek as punishment.

Oceania
 In Polynesian myth, Māui is the thief of fire. There are many variations of the myth. In the version told in New Zealand, an ancestress of Maui is the keeper of fire, and she stores it in her fingernails and toenails. Maui nearly tricks her into giving him all of her nails, but she catches onto him and throws her last toenail down, engulfing the ground in flame and nearly killing Maui.
 In the mythology of the Wurundjeri people of Australia, it was the Crow who stole the secret of fire from the Karatgurk women.

Nuclear weapons 
Since shortly after the detonation of the first atomic bombs, the destructive power of atomic weapons has been compared to the story of Prometheus and the theft of fire.

F. L. Campbell wrote in "Science on the March: Atomic Thunderbolts", in the September 1945 issue of The Scientific Monthly:

Modern Prometheans have raided Mount Olympus again and have brought back for man the very thunderbolts of Zeus.

The biography of Robert Oppenheimer by Kai Bird and Martin J. Sherwin is entitled American Prometheus in reference to the myth. Further comparisons to Prometheus have been made in publications by the United Nations, MITs Technology Review and Harvards Nuclear Study Group.

The "theft of fire" metaphor has also been used to argue against the proliferation of nuclear weapons by the Stockholm International Peace Research Institute and repeatedly by statesman Henry Kissinger as early as 1957, at the Munich Security Conference and as part of the Nuclear Threat Initiative with former Senator Sam Nunn, former Secretary of Defense William Perry and former Secretary of State George Shultz. Supporters of nuclear power have interpreted the anecdote more favorably.

See also
 Comparative mythology
 Control of fire by early humans
 Olympic flame

References

Further reading
 Abenójar, Óscar (2019). «La Anciana Y El Robo Del Fuego. Tipología Y distribución De Las Variantes Del Mito». In: Boletín De Literatura Oral 9 (julio):13-34. https://doi.org/10.17561/blo.v9.1.

External links

 
 O fogo e as chamas dos mitos  by Betty Mindlin Essay about the origin of fire, stealing of fire, keeping of fire in different South-American indigenous cultures

Creation myths
Comparative mythology
Fire
Theft